Elections for the Scottish district councils were held in 1977.

These were the second elections held to the 53 district councils established by the Local Government (Scotland) Act 1973. The previous elections had been held in 1974 with the authorities acting as "shadow" councils until May 1975. The elections took place when the Labour government of James Callaghan was extremely unpopular, with a subsequent collapse in the party's vote.

Background
The poll was held on 3 May and all district council seats were to be filled. Districts formed the second tier in local government in Scotland under the 1975 reorganisation, with regional councils forming the upper tier. It was intended that elections would normally take place on a four-year cycle, but as an interim measure the first two sets of district councils had terms of three years: 1974–77 and 1977–80. Regional elections were also to be on a four-year cycle, held midway between district elections.

Party performance
There was a large swing against Labour, who lost control of a number of councils in the industrial Central Belt where it had dominated local politics for decades. Labour lost its majority in Glasgow for the next three years (although they were still the largest party), very unusual in the late 20th century, with some high-profile casualties including the Labour group leader on the council, Dick Dynes. While they lost seats to the Scottish National Party in Glasgow and the industrial belt, the anti-Labour mood favoured the Conservatives in Edinburgh and the Liberals in Aberdeen and Inverclyde.

In retrospect these elections were the high point of the SNP's upsurge in the 1970s. Vice-chair Margo MacDonald predicted that they would make 100 net gains, but they only made 98 (winning 103, losing 5). Even so, this left half of Scotland under hung councils. They retained control of the council they held and gained three more. The party claimed to have secured a swing of approximately 9% since the October 1974 general election, meaning they would gain 21–27 parliamentary seats from the Labour Party, three from the Conservatives and one from the Liberal Party. Independent analysis placed the swing to the SNP of between 1 and 5 percent, giving them gains of 10–15 Labour seats and only a slight chance of making gains from the Conservatives or Liberals. In particular, the party did poorly in Nairn, putting the seat of party leader Winnie Ewing at risk (she lost the seat at the next election in 1979). The SNP's advance was halted the following year, with the 1978 Glasgow Garscadden by-election, 1978 Scottish regional elections, the 1978 Hamilton by-election and the 1978 Berwick and East Lothian by-election.

This election was also the first serious test of the new Scottish Labour Party of Jim Sillars which did not do well outside his South Ayrshire base, only winning three seats.

National results

|-
!colspan=2|Parties
!Votes
!Votes %
!Wards
|-
| 
|
|31.6
|282
|-
| 
|
|27.2
|259
|-
| 
|
|24.2
|170
|-
| 
|
|4.0
|62
|-
| style="width: 10px" bgcolor=|
| style="text-align: left;" scope="row" | Independent/Other
|
|13.1
|334
|-
!colspan=2|Total!! !! 100 !! 1107
|}

Results by council area
The seats on each council before and after the election were as follows:

Borders

Central

Dumfries and Galloway

Fife

Grampian

Highland

Lothian

Strathclyde

Tayside

References

 
1977
May 1977 events in the United Kingdom